German Township, Indiana may refer to one of the following places in the State of Indiana:

 German Township, Bartholomew County, Indiana
 German Township, Marshall County, Indiana
 German Township, St. Joseph County, Indiana
 German Township, Vanderburgh County, Indiana

See also 
German Township (disambiguation)

Indiana township disambiguation pages